Taylor Downing (born 20 July 1953) is a British historian and television producer. He studied at Latymer Upper School and Christ's College, Cambridge University, where he achieved a Double First in History. He worked at the Imperial War Museum and then for Thames Television for several years. In 1982, he formed a production company Flashback Television, for which he produced more than 300 TV documentaries for British and American broadcasters including several long-running series which have won many awards. He has recently written several popular history books.

His books include
 1942: Britain at the Brink
 1983: The World at the Brink (nominated for the Pushkin Book Prize)
 Night Raid: The True Story of the First Victorious British Para Raid of WWII
 Secret Warriors: Key Scientists, Code Breakers and Propagandists of the Great War
 Breakdown: The Crisis of Shell Shock on the Somme
 Spies In The Sky: The Secret Battle for Aerial Intelligence during World War II
 The World at War
 Churchill's War Lab: Code Breakers, Boffins and Innovators: the Mavericks Churchill Led to Victory
 Cold War with Sir Jeremy Isaacs

Downing is a Fellow of the Royal Historical Society.

References

1953 births
20th-century British historians
21st-century British historians
Fellows of the Royal Historical Society
People educated at The Latymer School
Alumni of the University of Cambridge
Living people